Cecil Rajendra (born 1941) is a Malaysian poet and lawyer. His poems have been published in more than 50 countries and translated into several languages.

Early life and education
Born in Penang, Rajendra completed his education at St. Xavier's Institution (elementary), the University of Singapore (undergraduate), and Lincoln's Inn (legal, London).

Career

Rajendra, nicknamed 'The Lawyer-Poet', writes controversial poems that address human rights and environmental problems. As an attorney, his work has focused on helping poorer people who are in need of legal aid. He is a co-founder of Penang Legal Aid Centre (PLAC). 

Working with photographer Ismail Hasim, Rajendra explored the backstreets of the island of Penang before the pair compiled and published Scent of an Island, a collection of poetry and black-and-white photographs of Penang.  

In 1993 he had his passport taken from him by the Malaysian government, to prevent him from traveling. A Malaysian High Commission spokesman stated, "Mr Rajendra's passport was retained for his anti-logging activities, which it was felt could damage the country's image overseas".

Recognition

In 2005, Rajendra was awarded the first Malaysian Lifetime Humanitarian Award "in recognition of his pioneering legal aid work and exemplary poetry".
Also in 2005 he was nominated for the Nobel Prize in Literature, which went to Harold Pinter.

Published works

Poetry 
 Embryo (Regency, 1965)
 Bones and Feathers (Heinemann, Writing in Asia Series, 1978)
 Refugees & Other Despairs (Choice Books, 1980)
 Hour of Assassins (1983; Bogle-L'Ouverture Press, 1993)
 Songs for the Unsung... Poems on Unpoetic Issues like War and Want, and Refugees (World Council of Churches, 1983)
 Child of the Sun (Bogle-L'Ouverture Publications, 1986; Bogle-L'Ouverture Press, 1993)
 Dove on Fire: Poems on Peace, Justice and Ecology (World Council of Churches, 1986)
 Lovers, Lunatics & Lallang (Bogle-L'Ouverture Publications, 1989)
 Broken Buds (Friends of Bogle [distributor], 1994)
 Personal & Profane
 Leave-taking

Books 
No Bed of Roses: The Rose Chan Story (Marshall Cavendish International Asia, 2013)

References

External links
 "Cecil Rajendra @ culture|futures", YouTube video.

1941 births
Living people
People from Penang
Malaysian human rights activists
Malaysian environmentalists
Malaysian poets
Malaysian people of Indian descent